The Lighthouse is a novel by English novelist Alison Moore, published on 15 August 2012. The novel deals with a middle-aged man's memories of childhood abandonment as he embarks on a walking trip through Germany. The book was shortlisted for the 2012 Man Booker Prize on 11 September 2012.

Synopsis
Futh, a recently separated middle-aged Englishman, takes a ferry to the Continent for a hiking trip through Germany. He brings with him memories of his mother abandoning him while he was still a child, his father's constant philandering, and his wife's infidelities. Meanwhile, Ester, the unhappy wife of a German hotelier, tries to get her husband’s attentions by cheating on him. When Futh and Ester's paths meet, the consequences are disastrous...

Reception
Jenn Ashworth of The Guardian called the novel "a chilly, heart-wrenching story". Boyd Tonkin, reviewing the book for The Independent, described it as "[d]isquieting, deceptive, crafted with a sly and measured expertise".

References

External links
 The Lighthouse on Alison Moore's official website.

2012 British novels
English novels
Novels set in Germany